Liederkranz may refer to:

A German-language choir, formerly for men only
Liederkranz (Grand Island, Nebraska), U.S., a historic building
Liederkranz cheese, an  American variety of Limburger cheese
Liederkranz of the City of New York, a German-American cultural society